Fajardo is a Spanish surname. Notable people with the surname include:

Arturo Fajardo (born 1961), Uruguayan Roman Catholic bishop
Claudia Fajardo (born 1985), Honduran sport shooter
Cody Fajardo (born 1992), American football player
Denisse Fajardo (born 1964), Peruvian volleyball player
Eduardo Fajardo (1924–2019), Spanish actor
Felicisimo Fajardo (1914–2001), Filipino basketball player
Fernando Fajardo (born 1975), Uruguayan footballer
Francisco Fajardo (died 1564), Spanish conquistador
Franzen Fajardo (born 1982), Filipino actor
Gabriel Fajardo (1917–2008), Filipino basketball player
Héctor Fajardo (born 1970), Mexican baseball player
João Fajardo (born 1978), Portuguese footballer
June Mar Fajardo (born 1989), Filipino basketball player
Kevin Fajardo (born 1989), Costa Rican footballer
Kim Fajardo (born 1993), Filipino volleyball player
Luis Fajardo (born 1963), Colombian footballer
Pablo Fajardo, Ecuadorian lawyer
Práxedes Fajardo, Philippine revolutionary
Sergio Fajardo (born 1956), Colombian mathematician and politician
Sharif Fajardo (born 1976), Puerto Rican basketball player
Sharon Fajardo (born 1989), Honduran swimmer
William Fajardo (born 1930), Mexican fencer

Spanish-language surnames